Pristimantis torrenticola is a species of frog in the family Strabomantidae.
It is endemic to Colombia.
Its natural habitats are tropical moist montane forests and rivers.
It is threatened by habitat loss.

Sources

torrenticola
Endemic fauna of Colombia
Amphibians of Colombia
Amphibians described in 1998
Taxonomy articles created by Polbot